The molecular formula C63H88CoN14O14P (molar mass: 1355.36 g/mol) may refer to:

 Vitamin B12
 Cyanocobalamin (Artificial B12)

Molecular formulas